Phloeopeccania is a genus of fungi within the family Lichinaceae. It contains three species.

References 

Lichinomycetes
Lichen genera
Taxa described in 1902